Multipremier (also known as MP) is a Mexican love and drama movie cable television network owned by MVS Comunicaciones. At midnight Monday to Saturday the channel transmits softcore porn movies. The channel is available on MASTV wireless cable television service and Dish Mexico in Mexico and DirecTV Latin America in Central and South America.

References

External links
 

Television networks in Mexico
MVS Comunicaciones